Cargolux operates freight services to the following international destinations as of August 2013.

Current destinations

Africa 
 
 Ouagadougou – Thomas Sankara International Airport Ouagadougou
 
 N'djamena – N'Djamena Airport
 
 Kinshasa – N'djili Airport
 
 Cairo – Cairo International Airport
 
 Accra – Kotoka International Airport
 
 Abidjan – Félix-Houphouët-Boigny International Airport
 
 Nairobi – Jomo Kenyatta International Airport
 
 Bamako – Modibo Keita International Airport
 
 Lagos – Murtala Muhammed International Airport
 
 Brazzaville – Maya-Maya Airport
 
 Johannesburg – O. R. Tambo International Airport

Americas 
 
 Campinas – Viracopos International Airport
 Curitiba – Afonso Pena International Airport
 Manaus – Eduardo Gomes International Airport
 Petrolina – Petrolina Airport
 Rio de Janeiro – Rio de Janeiro/Galeão International Airport
 São Paulo – São Paulo/Guarulhos International Airport
 
 Calgary – Calgary International Airport
 Toronto – Toronto Pearson International Airport
 
 Santiago – Arturo Merino Benítez International Airport
 
 Bogotá – El Dorado International Airport
 
 Latacunga – Cotopaxi International Airport
 Quito – Mariscal Sucre International Airport 
 
 Guatemala City – La Aurora International Airport
 
 Guadalajara – Guadalajara International Airport
 Mexico City – Mexico City International Airport
 
 Aguadilla – Rafael Hernández Airport
 
 Anchorage – Ted Stevens Anchorage International Airport
 Atlanta – Hartsfield–Jackson Atlanta International Airport
 Chicago – O'Hare International Airport
 Cincinnati – Cincinnati/Northern Kentucky International Airport
 Columbus – Rickenbacker International Airport
 Dallas – Dallas/Fort Worth International Airport
 Houston – George Bush Intercontinental Airport
 Huntsville – Huntsville International Airport
 Indianapolis – Indianapolis International Airport
 Los Angeles – Los Angeles International Airport
 Miami – Miami International Airport
 New York City – John F. Kennedy International Airport
 Seattle – Seattle–Tacoma International Airport

Asia 
 
 Baku – Heydar Aliyev International Airport
 
 Tbilisi – Tbilisi International Airport
 
 Hong Kong – Hong Kong International Airport (Focus City)
 
 Chennai – Chennai International Airport
 Mumbai – Chhatrapati Shivaji Maharaj International Airport
 
 Jakarta – Soekarno–Hatta International Airport
 
 Komatsu – Komatsu Airport
 Tokyo – Narita International Airport
 
 Amman – Queen Alia International Airport
 
 Almaty – Almaty International Airport
 
 Kuwait City – Kuwait International Airport
 
 Beirut – Beirut–Rafic Hariri International Airport
 
 Kuala Lumpur – Kuala Lumpur International Airport
 
 Muscat – Muscat International Airport
 
 Beijing – Beijing Capital International Airport
 Shanghai – Shanghai Pudong International Airport
 Shenzhen – Shenzhen Bao'an International Airport
 Xiamen – Xiamen Gaoqi International Airport
 Zhengzhou – Zhengzhou Xinzheng International Airport
 
 Doha – Hamad International Airport
 
 Taipei – Taoyuan International Airport
 
 Novosibirsk – Tolmachevo Airport (formerly to 2022)
 
 Dammam – King Fahd International Airport
 Riyadh – King Khalid International Airport
 
 Singapore – Singapore Changi Airport
 
 Seoul – Incheon International Airport
 
 Bangkok – Suvarnabhumi Airport
 
 Ashgabat – Ashgabat International Airport
 Turkmenbashi – Turkmenbashi International Airport
 
 Hanoi – Noi Bai International Airport
 Ho Chi Minh City – Tan Son Nhat International Airport
 
 Abu Dhabi – Abu Dhabi International Airport
 Dubai – Dubai International Airport
 Sharjah – Sharjah International Airport

Europe 
 
 Vienna – Vienna International Airport

 Munich – Munich Airport

 Budapest – Budapest Ferenc Liszt International Airport
 
 Milan – Milan Malpensa Airport (Hub for Cargolux Italia)
 
 Luxembourg City – Luxembourg Airport (Hub)
 
 Amsterdam – Amsterdam Airport Schiphol
 Maastricht – Maastricht Aachen Airport
 
 Oslo – Oslo Gardermoen Airport
 
 Barcelona – Josep Tarradellas Barcelona–El Prat Airport
 Zaragoza – Zaragoza Airport
 
 Zürich – Zürich Airport
 
 Istanbul – Istanbul Airport
 
 Glasgow – Glasgow Prestwick Airport
 London – London Stansted Airport

Terminated destinations

Asia 
 
 Karachi - Jinnah International Airport
 
 Manila - Ninoy Aquino International Airport

Europe 
 
 Helsinki - Helsinki Airport
 
 London - London Heathrow Airport

Oceania 
 
 Melbourne - Melbourne Airport
 Sydney - Sydney Airport
 
 Auckland - Auckland Airport

References 

Lists of airline destinations